Five male athletes from Armenia competed at the 1996 Summer Paralympics in Atlanta, United States.

See also
Armenia at the Paralympics
Armenia at the 1996 Summer Olympics

References 

Nations at the 1996 Summer Paralympics
1996
Summer Paralympics